Mario Lanza: Christmas Hymns and Carols/You Do Something To Me is a "twofer" disc released in 2004 by the Collectibles label under licence to BMG.  It incorporates two original Mario Lanza RCA Camden compilation LPs: Christmas Hymns and Carols and You Do Something To Me.

Christmas Hymns and Carols is a collection of carols and other religious songs recorded between 1950 and 1956. In addition to such familiar standards as "Silent Night" and "Away in a Manger," the compilation also includes "The Lord's Prayer" and the secular "Guardian Angels", the music for which was written by Harpo Marx.

You Do Something To Me is a compilation showcasing Mario Lanza's achievements in a number of genres, ranging from operatic arias to popular ballads. The selections were recorded between 1949 and 1953. Among the arias featured here is "Che gelida manina" from La Boheme, a recording that purportedly inspired conductor Arturo Toscanini to hail Lanza's as "the greatest natural tenor voice of the 20th century." A rare 1951 rendition of "Some Day" from The Vagabond King is also included.

References
Cesari, Armando. Mario Lanza: An American Tragedy (Fort Worth: Baskerville 2004).

Mario Lanza albums
RCA Victor albums
1956 compilation albums
1958 Christmas albums
2004 compilation albums
Christmas albums by American artists
Christmas compilation albums
Covers albums
Pop Christmas albums
Classical Christmas albums